The BMW 3 Series is a line of compact executive cars manufactured by the German automaker BMW since May 1975. It is the successor to the 02 Series and has been produced in seven generations.

The first generation of the 3 Series was only available as a 2-door saloon; however, the model range has since expanded to include a 4-door saloon, 2-door convertible, 2-door coupé, 5-door estate, 5-door liftback ("Gran Turismo") and 3-door hatchback body styles. Since 2013, the coupé and convertible models have been marketed as the 4 Series; therefore, the 3 Series range no longer includes these body styles.

The 3 Series is BMW's best-selling model, accounting for around 30% of the BMW brand's annual total sales (excluding motorbikes), and has won numerous awards throughout its history.

The M version of the 3 series, M3, debuted with the E30 M3 in 1986.

First generation (E21; 1975) 

The E21 replaced the 02 Series and was initially available as a 2-door sedan (also described as coupé).

At launch, all models used carburetted 4-cylinder engines; however, fuel-injected models were introduced in late 1975 and 6-cylinder engines were added in 1977. A cabriolet body style – manufactured by Baur – was available from 1978 to 1981.

Second generation (E30; 1982) 

On introduction in 1982, the E30 was produced solely in the 2-door sedan body style. Four-door sedan models were introduced in 1983, convertibles were introduced in 1985 and estate ("Touring") models were introduced in 1987.

The E30 was the first 3 Series to be available in wagon and 4-door sedan body styles. It was also the first 3 Series to offer a diesel engine, and all-wheel drive was introduced to the 3 Series range with the 325iX model. The BMW Z1 roadster was based on the E30 platform.

The first BMW M3 was built on the E30 platform. The E30 M3 is powered by the high-revving S14 four-cylinder petrol engine, which produced  in its final European-only iteration.

Third generation (E36; 1990) 

The E36 was sold in the following body styles: sedan, coupé, convertible, wagon (marketed as "Touring"), and hatchback (marketed as "3 Series Compact"). The Compact model, which was smaller than the traditional 4-door sedan version, was powered by the BMW's four-cylinder engines developed during the 1990s.

The E36 was the first 3 Series to be offered in a hatchback body style. It was also the first 3 Series to be available with a 6-speed manual transmission (in the 1996 M3), a 5-speed automatic transmission, and a four-cylinder diesel engine. The multi-link rear suspension was also a significant upgrade compared with previous generations of the 3 Series.

The M3 model is powered by the S50 and S52 straight-six engines. It was sold in coupé, sedan and convertible body styles.

The BMW Z3 roadster and coupe models were based on the E36 platform.

Fourth generation (E46; 1997)

The E46 was sold in the following body styles: sedan, coupé, convertible, wagon (marketed as "Touring"), and hatchback (marketed as "3 Series Compact").

The E46 generation introduced various electronic features to the 3 Series, including satellite navigation, electronic brake-force distribution, rain-sensing wipers and LED tail-lights. All-wheel drive, last available in the E30 3 Series, was reintroduced for the E46. It was available for the 325xi and 330xi sedan/wagon models. The E46 was the first 3 Series to be available with an engine using variable valve lift ("valvetronic").

The M3 version of the E46 was powered by the S54 straight-six engine and was available in coupé and convertible body styles (other than that, it was powered with the M52 or M54 in non-M3 cars). The transmissions available were a 6-speed manual or the 6-speed "SMG-II" sequential manual gearbox.

Fifth generation (E90/E91/E92/E93; 2004) 

The fifth generation 3 Series was produced in the sedan, wagon, coupé and cabriolet body styles. Due to the separate model codes for each body style, the term "E9X" is sometimes used to describe this generation of the 3 Series.

In 2006, the 335i became the first 3 Series model to be sold with a turbocharged gasoline engine. The E90 also saw the introduction of run-flat tires to the 3 Series range. Consequently, cars with run flats are not equipped with spare tires.

The E90/E92/E93 M3 was powered by the BMW S65 V8 engine. It was released in 2007 and was produced in sedan, coupe, and cabriolet body styles.

Production of the fifth-generation BMW 3 Series ended in 2013.

Sixth generation (F30/F31/F34/F35; 2011) 

The F30/F31/F35 has been produced in the sedan, coupé, convertible, station wagon and 5-door hatchback ("Gran Turismo") body styles. A long-wheelbase sedan is also available in China.

For the F30/F31/F34 series, the coupe and convertible models were produced from the 2013 year until 2014 when they were split from the 3 Series, redesigned, and sold as the BMW 4 Series. A new body style was introduced into the 3 Series range: the 3 Series Gran Turismo, a long-wheelbase hatchback.

In 2016, a plug-in hybrid drivetrain was first used in the 3 Series, in the 330e model. Also in 2016, a 3-cylinder engine was used for the first time in a 3 Series.

The M3 version (designated F80, the first time an M3 has used a separate model designation) was released in 2014 and is powered by the S55 twin-turbo straight-6 engine.

Production ended in 2019 with the end of F31 Touring production in June.

Seventh generation (G20/G21/G28; 2018) 

The BMW 3 Series (G20) was unveiled at the 2018 Paris Motor Show on October 2, 2018. The official images of the vehicle were revealed a day prior to its unveiling. The seventh generation of the 3 Series is also offered as a station wagon. The more powerful M3 and M3 Competition variants were delivered globally starting in 2021. The G20 is the first 3 Series generation to bring an M3 Touring to market. Since 2022, it gained a battery electric version exclusive for the Chinese market as the i3, sharing its powertrain with the globally marketed i4.

M version 

The M3 is the most powerful version of the 3 Series. It was designed and developed by BMW's in-house motorsport division, BMW M.

M3 models have been derived from the E30, E36, E46, E90/E92/E93, and F30 (designated F80) 3 series and have been marketed with coupe, sedan and convertible body styles. Upgrades over the "standard" 3 Series automobiles include more powerful and responsive engines, improved handling/suspension/braking systems, aerodynamic body enhancements, lightweight components, and interior/exterior accents with the tri-color "M" (Motorsport) emblem.

The last M3 coupe was produced in Germany on 5 July 2013, replaced by the F82/F83 M4 Coupe and convertible starting with the 2015 model year, but the M3 name remains in use for the sedan version. The new generation M3 was reintroduced in 2021, codenamed G80 from the 7th generation 3 Series (G20). The M3 represented above (The F80) was powered by a BMW N55 engine producing 431 horsepower and 7,600 RPM.

In June 2022, BMW revealed the first BMW M3 Touring, codenamed G81. Based on the seventh generation 3 Series, it marks the first time a BMW M Touring model reached the market. The touring version of the M3 contains the same engine and interior setup as the M3 sedan, but extends the roof line to become a wagon.

Awards and recognition 
The 3 Series has been on Car and Driver magazine's annual 10 Best list 22 times, from 1992 through 2014, making it the longest-running entry in the list. In their December 2009 issue, Grassroots Motorsports magazine named the BMW 3 Series as the second-most important performance car built during the previous 25 years. In January 2021, the BMW 330e M Sport (M Sport Pro Package) was named Executive Car of the Year by What Car? magazine. What Car? awarded the 3 Series five stars out of five in its review of the car.

The plug-in hybrid version of the car was the UK's best-selling plug-in hybrid car of 2021 having achieved 10,979 new registrations throughout the year, beating the Mercedes A-Class by over 4,000 registrations.

Production and sales 

*Figures since 2013 includes the BMW 4 Series

References

External links 

 Official BMW 3 Series

3 Series
All-wheel-drive vehicles
Mid-size cars
Compact executive cars
Convertibles
Coupés
Hatchbacks
Rear-wheel-drive vehicles
Euro NCAP large family cars
Sports sedans
Station wagons
1970s cars
1980s cars
1990s cars
2000s cars
2010s cars